Anne or Ann Lee may refer to:

Ann Lee (1736–1784), American religious leader known as "Mother Ann Lee"
Ann Lee (activist) (born 1929 or 1930), American cannabis activist
Ann Lee (actress) (1918–2003) American businesswoman and actress
Ann Lee (illustrator) (1753– 1790), British natural history illustrator
Anne Wharton (1659–1685), née Lee, English writer
Anne Lee, Countess of Rochester (1585–1648)
Ann Lee (singer) (born 1967), British eurodance singer
Ann Lee (professor), Chinese-American professor and author
Anne Carter Lee (1839–1862), daughter of General Robert E. Lee

See also

Annie Lee (disambiguation)
Anna Lee (disambiguation)